was a Noh actor who, in 1956, was expelled from the art form, banned from appearing onstage, and from associating with other Noh performers, on charges that he had been "impertinent and offensive" towards the Kita school of Noh, and towards the family of its head (sōke).

References

Voltaire Garces Cang, "Preserving Intangible Heritage in Japan: The Role of the Iemoto System," International Journal of Intangible Heritage 3 (2008), 76.

Noh
Japanese male stage actors
1972 deaths
1902 births